The 5th Central Committee of the Chinese Communist Party was in session from 1927 to 1928.  It was set into motion by the 5th National Congress. It was followed by the 6th Central Committee of the Chinese Communist Party.

Beginning with this session, the CCP Central Executive Committee was renamed to the CCP Central Committee.

It had 31 members and 14 alternate members.  It was preceded by the 4th Central Executive Committee of the Chinese Communist Party.

Its first plenary session elected the 5th Politburo of the Chinese Communist Party in 1927.

Members
Chen Duxiu
Li Weihan
Qu Qiubai
Cai Hesen
Li Lisan
Deng Zhongxia
Su Zhaozheng
Xiang Ying
Xiang Zhongfa
Zhang Guotao
Zhao Shiyan
Zhang Tailei
Tan Pingshan
Zhou Enlai
Liu Shaoqi
Ren Bishi
Yun Daiying
Peng Pai
Xia Xi
Peng Shuzhi
Luo Zhanglong
Gu Shunzhang

Alternate Members
Mao Zedong
Chen Tanqiu

External links
 5th Central Committee of the CPC, People's Daily Online.

Central Committee of the Chinese Communist Party
1927 establishments in China
1928 disestablishments in China